Dan Harold Gloor (born December 4, 1952) is a Canadian former professional ice hockey player. He played two games in the National Hockey League with the Vancouver Canucks, who selected him in the 1972 NHL amateur draft, and played several years in the minor Central Hockey League. Gloor also spent one season in Austria with Innsbrucker EV, and retired in 1979. In 1973 he won the Gary F. Longman Memorial Trophy as the top rookie in the International Hockey League. His two games with the Canucks came in January 1974: his debut was against the California Golden Seals on January 11, and he played the next night against the New York Rangers before returning to the Seattle Totems of the minor Western Hockey League for the rest of the season.

Career statistics

Regular season and playoffs

External links 

1952 births
Canadian ice hockey centres
Des Moines Capitols players
Ice hockey people from Ontario
Innsbrucker EV players
Living people
People from Perth County, Ontario
Peterborough Petes (ice hockey) players
Seattle Totems (CHL) players
Seattle Totems (WHL) players
Tulsa Oilers (1964–1984) players
Vancouver Canucks draft picks
Vancouver Canucks players